Lake Lagunillas is a lake in the Andes of far southeastern Peru.

In 2014, the pupfish Orestias luteus made up slightly more than 70% of catches in fisheries, with the remaining being the introduced rainbow trout, a species also farmed in the lake. Lake Lagunillas is home to the unusual and relatively large "escomeli" form of the Titicaca water frog.

See also
List of lakes in Peru

References

INEI, Compendio Estadistica 2007, page 26

Lakes of Peru
Lakes of Puno Region